Founded in 1883, the Glasgow Football Association, based in the city of Glasgow, Scotland and affiliated to the national Scottish Football Association, is one of the oldest such bodies in football. In the modern game its influence is limited, the remit being "to represent the interests of the senior football clubs in Glasgow". Those senior clubs competing across the divisions in the Scottish Professional Football League include the two largest and most successful in the country by some distance, Celtic and Rangers (collectively the Old Firm), as well as Partick Thistle, Queen's Park (the oldest football club in Scotland) and Clyde (who have not been based permanently in Glasgow since the 1980s); the three smaller clubs exist in the shadow of their dominant neighbours. A sixth team, Third Lanark, had a strong record until their sudden collapse in the mid 1960s.

The association's most prominent role is the administration of the Glasgow Cup, a tournament for clubs in the city first contested in 1888, which was once an coveted prize but diminished in importance during the 20th century as national and continental football became more popular; from the 1990s it was contested between the member clubs' youth teams, with a 2020 revamp mixing senior teams from the smaller clubs and underage teams from Celtic and Rangers. In addition to the Glasgow Cup, the association aims to "encourage the involvement of local schools and the development of youth football through a variety of other programmes and events". The Glasgow FA looks after the city's senior clubs but not those in lower categories: for example, the West of Scotland Football League contains several Glasgow-based semi-professional clubs (most previously affiliated to the Scottish Junior Football Association, West Region), and the Greater Glasgow Premier AFL is just one of several leagues involving teams from the city under the Scottish Amateur Football Association umbrella.

History
The seven founders of the organisation at a meeting on 6 March 1883 (formed to compete with the older – 1877 – rival Edinburgh Association) included three of the six senior clubs that would carry on membership into the mid 20th century: Rangers, Clyde and Queen's Park, plus Northern, Partick and Pollokshields Athletic. By the end of 1883, thirteen clubs were members: the initial six plus Battlefield, Cowlairs, Luton, Partick Thistle, South-Western, Third Lanark and Thistle. The obvious absentee from the list is Celtic, which was first conceived in 1887 and began playing the following year; in contrast, Clydesdale were one of the leading clubs who had provided players for Scotland in the 1870s but were defunct by the time of the association's founding.

Glasgow had a representative team which took part in challenge matches against other associations, most notably a series against the Sheffield Football Association which ran from 1874 to 1960, and played an important role in the early development of football due to the contrasting styles, rules and innovations used in two cities that were home to some of the oldest institutions of the game, such as Queen's Park and Sheffield F.C. respectively. The fixture fell out of favour in the late 1940s with new tournaments such as Scottish and English League Cups taking precedence, but was temporarily revived when floodlights were installed at more grounds to accommodate evening matches.

Other matches were played by Glasgow against the London XI in the 1880s, and against Edinburgh/East of Scotland for charity fundraising, particularly in the 1920s, (a one-off match between them as part of the George VI coronation celebrations in 1937 drew 40,000 spectators to Hampden Park) as well as occasional fixtures such as the last editions of the Glasgow Merchants Charity Cup against English clubs in the mid-1960s, and a one-off match against a Football League XI for the Silver Jubilee of Elizabeth II in 1977.

The Scottish Football Association (SFA) handled the selection for matches that involved Glasgow before 1883, but the Glasgow Association inherited management of the team after its formation.

Glasgow v Sheffield

68 matches played;
Glasgow: 33 wins (168 goals);
Sheffield: 23 wins (123 goals);
12 draws.

Match list

Glasgow's score is given first in all cases.

Glasgow v London 

8 matches played;

Glasgow: 5 wins (27 goals);

London: 2 wins (15 goals);

1 draw.

Match list 
Glasgow's score is given first in all cases.

References

A Record of pre-war Scottish League Players, John Litster, Scottish Football Historian magazine, October 2012 (all Glasgow players involved denoted in statistical list)

External links

1883 establishments in Scotland
Football governing bodies in Scotland
Organisations based in Glasgow
Sports organizations established in 1883
Football in Glasgow